The Lace Reader (2006) is a novel by Brunonia Barry. The novel is set in Salem, Massachusetts, the American town famous for the Salem witch trials. A crucial plot device is the Ipswich lace that the protagonist's family would make.

The novel came to be well known for its unusual route to mainstream publishing. Originally self-published by the author it became a local success story, got rave reviews in many places including Publishers Weekly, and was eventually picked up by the US branch of HarperCollins in a multimillion-dollar 
deal.

It soon became a New York Times bestseller and is currently under option for a film. Rumoured casting includes Rachel McAdams as the lead character, Towner Whitney.

When asked about her inspiration for the book, Barry said, as reported on her blog:

For quite some time, I have been fascinated by the Hero’s Journey or the monomyth. Most stories that follow this pattern have a decidedly male orientation: a lone individual acts heroically and saves the day. I wondered if there might be an alternate form, a feminine Hero’s Journey. So I began to look at stories that featured female protagonists to see if they offered something different. What I found surprised me. Most of these women were either killed off or were ultimately rescued from their plight by male heros. Unsatisfied, I wondered if I could write a Hero’s Journey for women where the strong but wounded heroine must find a way to save herself.

References

External links
 The Lace Reader

2009 American novels
Novels set in Massachusetts
Salem, Massachusetts
HarperCollins books
American fantasy novels
2009 debut novels
Twins in fiction
Fiction set in 1996